Stephanie S. Watowich is an American immunologist. Watowich is the deputy chair of the Department of Immunology at MD Anderson Cancer Center in Houston, TX. She is a professor within the department as well and serves as the co-director of the Center for Inflammation and Cancer at the MD Anderson Cancer Center. Watowich’s research has focused on transcriptional control of innate immunity, with specific interest in the actions of the cytokine-activated STAT transcriptional regulators.

Early life and education
Watowich completed her Bachelor of Science degree in biology in 1983 from Carleton College. In her final year at Carleton, she conducted an independent study on RNA splicing. After graduating from Carleton, Watowich’s adviser John Tymoczko helped her find her first research job at the University of Chicago with Geoffrey Greene. She went on to receive her PhD from Northwestern University under the mentorship of Richard Morimoto and completed her postdoctoral training in the lab of Harvey Lodish at the Whitehead Institute.

Career
Upon completing her education, Watowich joined the faculty in the Department of Immunology at the MD Anderson Cancer Center. She served as director of the graduate Immunology Program from 2004 until 2010. In her final year as director, Watowich was the recipient of the McGovern Award for Outstanding Teaching. Watowich served as associate dean of the MD Anderson UTHealth Graduate School from 2012-2015, while continuing her research at MD Anderson. From there, she became a full professor in the Department of Immunology and the co-director of the Center for Inflammation and Cancer at the MD Anderson Cancer Center. Watowich was recently promoted to deputy chair of the Department of Immunology at MD Anderson due to her impressive work within the immunology field and her outstanding commitment to science and continued education. She has been the recipient of several research and training grants from the NIH and Cancer Prevention and Research Institute of Texas, including Targeting neutrophil elastase as a novel therapy for metastatic breast cancer in 2018 from the Cancer Prevention and Research Institute of Texas. In the same year, Watowich was also elected to the International Cytokine & Interferon Society.

References

External links

Living people
University of Texas MD Anderson Cancer Center faculty
Carleton College alumni
Northwestern University alumni
American immunologists
Year of birth missing (living people)